Robert Warner (fl. 1390), of Marlborough, Wiltshire, was an English politician.

He was a Member (MP) of the Parliament of England for Marlborough in January 1390. In 1388–89, he was Mayor of Marlborough.

References

Year of birth missing
Year of death missing
English MPs January 1390
People from Marlborough, Wiltshire